Mookie, Mooki or Mooky may refer to:

People
 Mookie Betts (born 1992), American Major League Baseball player
 Michael Blaiklock (born 1969), American actor and writer
 Mookie Blaylock (born 1967), American former National Basketball Association player
 Mooky Greidinger (born 1952), Israeli businessman, CEO of Cineworld
 Shmuel Katz (politician) (1914-2008), Israeli writer, historian and journalist, Zionist and member of Irgun, nicknamed "Mooki"
 Derrell Mitchell (born 1971), American football coach and  player
 Michael Moore (offensive lineman) (born 1976), American football player
 Mookie Salaam (born 1990), American sprinter
 Mookie Singerman, member of the band Genghis Tron
 Michael Terracciano, webcomic artist and author 
 Darryl Watkins (born 1984), American basketball player
 Mookie Wilson (born 1956), American baseball player
 Thabo Mooki (born 1974), South African footballer
 Mooky the Clown, stage name of Laci Endresz Jr. who performs at Blackpool Tower Circus
 Mooky, stage name of Mundzir Abdul Latif, lead singer of the band One Buck Short
 Mooki (singer) (born 1975), Israeli singer

Other uses
 Mooki River, New South Wales, Australia
 Mookie, a fictional character in the film Do the Right Thing, played by Spike Lee

See also
 Mook (disambiguation)

Lists of people by nickname